Marie I or Mary (1136 – 25 July 1182 in St Austrebert, Montreuil, France) was the suo jure Countess of Boulogne from 1159 to 1170. She also held the post of Abbess of Romsey for five years until her abduction by Matthew of Alsace, who forced her to marry him. She is one of several possible identities of the author Marie de France.

Early years

Marie was the younger daughter of King Stephen of England and his wife Matilda I, Countess of Boulogne. She was born in 1136, one year after her father had succeeded to the English throne. His reign was to be marked by the civil war known as "The Anarchy" during which he fought a series of battles to retain the crown which was claimed by his cousin Empress Matilda. Marie had three brothers, Eustace, William, Baldwin, and one sister, Matilda.

Abbess
Marie became a novice at the Priory of Lillechurch in Kent, but later transferred to Romsey Abbey in Hampshire. The abbey had been rebuilt by her uncle Henry of Blois, Bishop of Winchester. It was at Romsey that she became a nun sometime between 1148 and 1155. She was elected Abbess of Romsey in 1155, the year following her father's death and the subsequent ascension to the English throne of Empress Matilda's son Henry II.

About four years later, on 11 October 1159, her brother William died in Toulouse. As his marriage to Isabel de Warenne, Countess of Surrey had been childless, Marie, his only surviving sibling, succeeded as the suo jure Countess of Boulogne.

Countess of Boulogne
Matthew of Alsace abducted Marie from the abbey in 1160, and forced her to marry him in defiance of her religious vows. He therefore became jure uxoris Count of Boulogne and co-ruler. On 18 December 1161, Pope Alexander III wrote a letter to the Archbishop of Rheims in which he discussed Marie's abduction by Matthew of Alsace and her subsequent constrained marriage. The couple had two daughters.

Marie's marriage to Matthew was annulled in 1170. This was the same year that she gave birth to their younger daughter, Mathilde, in Louvain.

Later life
Following the annulment, Marie re-entered the religious life as a Benedictine nun at St. Austrebert, Montreuil, where she died on 25 July 1182 at the age of about 46. Her former husband Matthew continued to reign as Count of Boulogne until his death in 1173, when their eldest daughter Ida succeeded as countess. Following the death of Ida's daughter, Matilda II, the county of Boulogne eventually passed to Adelaide of Brabant, daughter of Marie's second daughter, Mathilde.

Issue
 Ida, Countess of Boulogne (1160/1161 – 21 April 1216), married firstly Gerard of Guelders; secondly Berthold IV of Zahringen; and thirdly Count Renaud de Dammartin, by whom she had one daughter, Matilda II of Boulogne, who succeeded her as countess.
 Mathilde of Flanders (1170 – 16 October 1210), married in 1179 Henry I, Duke of Brabant

References

Sources

Further reading
S. P. Thompson (2004) Mary (Mary of Blois), suo jure countess of Boulogne (d. 1182), Online Oxford Dictionary of National Biography

1136 births
1182 deaths
12th-century French nuns
12th-century women rulers
12th-century English nuns
French countesses
English princesses
Counts of Boulogne
House of Blois
House of Metz
Children of Stephen, King of England
Benedictine nuns
Anglo-Normans
Daughters of kings